Kennett Berkeley Dawson (August 30, 1896 - February 16, 1961) served in the California State Assembly representing the 22nd district from 1935 to 1939. during World War I he served in the United States Army.

References

United States Army personnel of World War I
Republican Party members of the California State Assembly
1896 births
1961 deaths
Politicians from Ogden, Utah